Mount Genevra is a remote  mountain summit located on the Kings–Kern Divide of the Sierra Nevada mountain range, in Tulare County of northern California. Mount Genevra ranks as the 138th highest summit in California, and the eighth highest peak on the Kings–Kern Divide.

History

The mountain was named in 1899 from the summit of Mount Brewer by Joseph Nisbet LeConte, his future wife Helen Gompertz, and others in the climbing party including Genevra Magee, for whom the mountain was named. Mrs. Genevra Evo Magee and her husband Walter Magee worked at the University of California in the Physical Culture program. This mountain's name was officially adopted in 1928 by the United States Board on Geographic Names.

The first ascent of the summit was made July 15, 1925, by Norman Clyde, who is credited with 130 first ascents, most of which were in the Sierra Nevada.

Climbing

Established climbing routes:

 East face – August 6, 1939, by Dave Nelson, Earl Jessen, Hal Leich
 North ridge – August 3, 1940, by Robert Schonborn and party of six
 North face – July 19, 1951, by Bill Bade, Barbara Lilley, Franklin Barnett

Climate
According to the Köppen climate classification system, Mount Genevra is located in an alpine climate zone. Most weather fronts originate in the Pacific Ocean, and travel east toward the Sierra Nevada mountains. As fronts approach, they are forced upward by the peaks, causing them to drop their moisture in the form of rain or snowfall onto the range (orographic lift). Precipitation runoff from the mountain drains north to Bubbs Creek, and south into headwaters of the Kern River.

See also

 List of mountain peaks of California

References

External links
 Weather forecast: Mount Genevra

Mountains of Tulare County, California
Mountains of Kings Canyon National Park
Mountains of Sequoia National Park
North American 3000 m summits
Mountains of Northern California
Sierra Nevada (United States)